The Exchange Hotel, completed in 1841 in Richmond, VA, was a Gothic revival four-story designed by Isaiah Rogers. It was very popular before the Civil War.

The Ballard House opened up across the street in 1855. It was a five-story Italianate. It was at Fourteenth Street and Franklin Street. The two were competitors for several years. Then they merged with a bridge that went over the street to form the Ballard-Exchange. Their old architecture prevented them from being one of the premiere Richmond hotels at the time.

On January 18, 1862, Former President of the United States John Tyler died in the hotel, as did his second wife, Julia Gardiner Tyler, on July 10, 1889. 

It was demolished from 1900-1901, shortly after closing thanks to competition from the newer Jefferson Hotel.

References

External links
Exchange Hotel: Written accounts 1862-1899

Hotels in Richmond, Virginia
Hotel buildings completed in 1841
Hotels established in 1841
Buildings and structures demolished in 1900
1841 establishments in Virginia
Demolished buildings and structures in Virginia
Demolished hotels in the United States